In mathematics, the second neighborhood problem is an unsolved problem about oriented graphs posed by Paul Seymour. Intuitively, it suggests that in a social network described by such a graph, someone will have at least as many friends-of-friends as friends.
The problem is also known as the second neighborhood conjecture or Seymour’s distance two conjecture.

Statement
An oriented graph is a finite directed graph obtained from a simple undirected graph by assigning an orientation to each edge. Equivalently, it is a directed graph that has no self-loops, no parallel edges, and no two-edge cycles. These two neighborhoods form disjoint sets, neither of which contains  itself.

In 1990, Paul Seymour conjectured that, in every oriented graph, there always exists at least one vertex  whose second neighborhood is at least as large as its first neighborhood. The problem was first published by Nathaniel Dean and Brenda J. Latka in 1995, in a paper that studied the problem on a restricted class of oriented graphs, the tournaments (orientations of complete graphs). Dean had previously conjectured that every tournament obeys the second neighborhood conjecture, and this special case became known as Dean's conjecture.

A vertex in a directed graph whose second neighborhood is at least as large as its first neighborhood is called a Seymour vertex.
In the second neighborhood conjecture, the condition that the graph have no two-edge cycles is necessary, for in graphs that have such cycles (for instance the complete oriented graph) all second neighborhoods may be empty or small.

Partial results
 proved Dean's conjecture, the special case of the second neighborhood problem for tournaments.

For some graphs, a vertex of minimum out-degree will be a Seymour vertex. For instance, if a directed graph has a sink, a vertex of out-degree zero, then the sink is automatically a Seymour vertex, because its first and second neighborhoods both have size zero. In a graph without sinks, a vertex of out-degree one is always a Seymour vertex.
For arbitrary graphs with higher vertex degrees, the vertices of minimum degree might not be Seymour vertices, but the existence of a low-degree vertex can still lead to the existence of a nearby Seymour vertex. Using this sort of reasoning, the second neighborhood conjecture has been proven to be true for any oriented graph that contains at least one vertex of out-degree ≤ 6.

Random tournaments and some random directed graphs graphs have many Seymour vertices with high probability.
Every oriented graph has a vertex whose second neighborhood is at least  times as big as the first neighborhood,
where

is the real root of the polynomial .

See also
Friendship paradox

References

External links
Seymour's 2nd Neighborhood Conjecture, Open Problems in Graph Theory and Combinatorics, Douglas B. West.

Unsolved problems in graph theory
Conjectures